Sir John Eden, 4th Baronet (1740–1812), was a British politician who sat in the House of Commons between 1774 and 1790.
 
Eden was the eldest son of Sir Robert Eden, 3rd Baronet and his wife Mary Davison of Beamish, county Durham, and was born on 16 September 1740. He succeeded his father in the baronetcy on 25 June 1755.  He was educated at Eton College from 1755 to 1758 and at Trinity College, Cambridge in 1759. He married firstly Catherine Thompson daughter of John Thompson of Kirby Hall, Yorkshire on 26 June 1764 and secondly Dorothea Johnson, of York on 9 April 1767.

In 1774 he was returned unopposed as Member of Parliament for Durham County and was a supporter of Lord North's administration.   He was returned again in 1780  although it was said of him shortly after that ‘He holds the business of the House in great contempt, generally comes down after dinner, and is always the first to call for the question.’  He was re-elected in 1784 and at the time of the Regency crisis in 1788 complained of being recalled to parliament. There is no record of his ever having spoken in the House and appeared to prefer hunting to spending time at parliament. In 1789 he became anxious about his seat citing the threat of an alien banker and was defeated in the 1790 British general election

Eden died on 23 August 1812.

References

Sources
Kidd, Charles, Williamson, David (editors). Debrett's Peerage and Baronetage (1990 edition). New York: St Martin's Press, 1990.

|-

1740 births
1812 deaths
People educated at Eton College
Alumni of Trinity College, Cambridge
British MPs 1768–1774
British MPs 1774–1780
British MPs 1780–1784
British MPs 1784–1790
Members of the Parliament of Great Britain for English constituencies
Baronets in the Baronetage of England